Sankin-kōtai (now commonly written as ) was a policy of the Tokugawa shogunate during most of the Edo period of Japanese history. The purpose was to strengthen central control over the daimyōs (major feudal lords). It required feudal lords, daimyō, to alternate living for a year in their domain and in Edo, the capital.

History
Toyotomi Hideyoshi had earlier established a similar practice of requiring his feudal lords to keep their wives and heirs at Osaka Castle or the nearby vicinity as hostages to ensure their loyalty. Following the Battle of Sekigahara and the establishment of the Tokugawa Shogunate, this practice was continued at the new capital of Edo as a matter of custom. It was made compulsory for the tozama daimyōs in 1635, and for the fudai daimyōs from 1642. Aside from an eight-year period under the rule of Tokugawa Yoshimune, the law remained in force until 1862.

Description

The details changed throughout the 26 decades of Tokugawa rule, but generally, the requirement was that the daimyōs of every han move periodically between Edo and his fief, typically spending alternate years in each place. His wife and heir were required to remain in Edo as hostages while he was away. The expenditures necessary to maintain lavish residences in both places, and for the procession to and from Edo, placed financial strains on the daimyo, making them unable to wage war. The frequent travel of the daimyo encouraged road building and the construction of inns and facilities along the routes, generating economic activity.

There were a number of exceptions for certain fudai daimyōs in the vicinity of Edo, who were allowed to alternate their attendance in Edo every six months instead. Temporary exceptional dispensations were also occasionally granted due to illness or extreme extenuating circumstances.

In principle, the sankin-kōtai was a military service to the shōgun. Each daimyō was required to furnish a number of soldiers (samurai) in accordance with the kokudaka assessment of his domain. These soldiers accompanied the daimyō on the processions to and from Edo.

With hundreds of daimyōs entering or leaving Edo each year,  were almost daily occurrences in the shogunal capital. The main routes to the provinces were the kaidō.

The sankin-kōtai figures prominently in some Edo-period ukiyo-e woodblock prints, as well as in popular theater such as kabuki and bunraku.

Similar practices 
King Louis XIV of France instituted a similar practice upon the completion of his palace at Versailles, requiring the French nobility, particularly the ancient Noblesse d'épée ("nobility of the sword") to spend six months of each year at the palace, for reasons similar to those of the Japanese shōguns. The nobles were expected to assist the king in his daily duties and state and personal functions, including meals, parties, and, for the privileged, rising from and getting into bed, bathing, and going to church.

Notes

References

Further reading
 Jansen, Marius B. (2000). The Making of Modern Japan. Cambridge: Harvard University Press. ;  OCLC 44090600
 Kenkyusha's New Japanese-English Dictionary, Tokyo 1991, 
 Constantine Nomikos Vaporis (2008). Tour of Duty: Samurai, Military Service in Edo, and the Culture of Early Modern Japan.  Univ of Hawaii.

External links 

Edo period
Japanese historical terms